Michael Richard Letzig (born May 7, 1980) is an American professional golfer who has played on the PGA Tour and the Web.com Tour.

Letzig was born  in Richmond, Missouri. He played college golf for the University of New Mexico (where he played with fellow PGA Tour professionals Spencer Levin and Wil Collins) and turned professional in 2002. It was Collins that convinced Letzig to attend the University of New Mexico when they met in a junior tournament in Colorado.

Letzig graduated from Richmond High School in 1998, where he led the Spartans to the Class 2 state title and also won the individual state title in the process. Letzig quickly made a name for himself as a freshman in 1995 when he shot a 3-under-par 33 in his first varsity match, which still stands a Missouri state record for low 9-hole score on a par-36 course. While at the University of New Mexico, Letzig was chosen as a freshman All-American, and Mountain West Player of the Year in 2003.

Letzig turned pro in 2003, and won his first career event at the New Mexico Open. His next two professional victories took place on the NGA Hooters Tour: at the Indian Lakes Resort Classic in Illinois, and at the Statesville Classic in North Carolina. His latest victory came at the first Gateway Tour event held in 2012 in Arizona, where he completed an amazing stretch on five holes scoring two eagles and three birdies to take a two stroke victory on the final day.

Letzig earned his 2008 PGA Tour card by finishing 12th on the 2007 Nationwide Tour, and maintained his card for 2009 by finishing 93rd on the money list.  He would finish in the top-10 five times during 2008.  He would follow in 2009 with two top-10s at the RBC Canadian Open and a final round match up with Tiger Woods at the Buick Open.  His only top-10 finish in 2010 was during the RBC Canadian Open, and in 2011 at the Reno-Tahoe Open.

Letzig has not won on the PGA Tour nor the Web.com Tour, but he came in second place at the 2008 Ginn sur Mer Classic to Ryan Palmer by a stroke. His best finish on the Web.com Tour was 2nd in 2007 at the Nationwide Tour Championship at Barona Creek.

With no status on either tour, Letzig qualified for PGA Tour Canada in 2015 with a T2 at his qualifying tournament. He earned his first win at a PGA Tour-sanctioned event at the SIGA Dakota Dunes Open.

Amateur wins
2002 Missouri Amateur

Professional wins (5)

PGA Tour Canada wins (1)

NGA Hooters Tour wins (2)
2006 Indian Lakes Resort Classic, Statesville Classic

Gateway Tour wins (1)
2012 Arizona Series - Tournament 1 (Anthem)

Other wins (1)
2003 New Mexico Open

Results in major championships

CUT = missed the half-way cut
Note: Letzig never played in the Masters Tournament or the PGA Championship.

See also
2007 Nationwide Tour graduates
2012 PGA Tour Qualifying School graduates

References

External links

American male golfers
New Mexico Lobos men's golfers
PGA Tour golfers
Korn Ferry Tour graduates
Golfers from Missouri
People from Richmond, Missouri
Sportspeople from Kansas City, Missouri
1980 births
Living people